Boulbon is a commune in the Bouches-du-Rhône department in southern France. The Baroque composer and serpent player Guillaume Poitevin (1646–1706) was born in Boulbon.

Population

See also
 Communes of the Bouches-du-Rhône department

References

Communes of Bouches-du-Rhône
Bouches-du-Rhône communes articles needing translation from French Wikipedia